"NoMa" is a moniker for the area north of Massachusetts Avenue located north and east of Union Station in Washington, D.C., United States. NoMa includes the neighborhoods of Sursum Corda, Eckington, and Near Northeast and includes a section historically known as Swampoodle.

NoMa includes:
A core area consisting of all the blocks bounded by North Capitol Street on the west, Q Street NE on the north, the Amtrak/MARC railroad on the east and K Street NE on the south,
To the south of the core area, one to two blocks west of the railroad tracks/Union Station from K Street south to Massachusetts Avenue, 
To the northeast of the core area, one to two blocks east of the railroad tracks from K Street north to Florida Avenue, and
To the north of the core area, the blocks between First Street NE and the railroad tracks from Q to R streets

NoMa's southern tip at Union Station/Columbus Circle is a half-mile north of the U.S. Capitol. According to the NoMa Business Improvement District, the neighborhood was home to 13,000 residents as of January 2023, with a total of 50,000 employees working in the area.

History
After much planning for the area in the late 1990s, the 2004 opening of the New York Ave–Florida Ave Metro, now NoMa-Gallaudet U station, sparked development in the neighborhood. By 2016, NoMa had turned a corner and become one of the most up-and-coming neighborhoods in D.C., according to a report in The New York Times. REI opened one of its outdoor supply big box stores in the renovated Washington Coliseum, where the N.B.A.’s Capitols had played in the 1940s. 2020 Census data showed that Ward 6 which includes parts of NoMa, Navy Yard and Southwest, was responsible for a third of D.C.'s 15% population growth over the previous decade.

A longstanding homeless encampment under the K Street underpass was cleared in 2020, with similar encampments under the L Street and M Street underpasses cleared in 2021. Most of the unhoused people agreed to move into apartments as part of a city program. The underpasses had previously been cleared around 100 times, but people returned soon thereafter. The city's removal of the encampments drew criticism after a bulldozer operator accidentally began to clear a tent with a man inside, and who was hospitalized as a result.

Landmarks

NoMa includes several historic structures:
 the Woodward & Lothrop Service Warehouse (on the National Register of Historic Places)
 the Uline Arena
 St. Aloysius Church
 Gonzaga College High School
 the Government Printing Office building
Bureau of Alcohol, Tobacco, Firearms & Explosives

Union Market borders NoMa on the east and has a gourmet food hall, retail non-food stalls and a rooftop with bar, picnic tables and event stage.

Transportation
The area is served by many modes of transportation, including:
 Washington Metro Rail, with stations at NoMa-Gallaudet U station and Union Station both on the Red Line 
 MARC commuter trains to Maryland and West Virginia at Union Station
 VRE commuter trains to Virginia at Union Station
 Amtrak long-distance trains, and Northeast Corridor trains including Acela, at Union Station
bus, including local (WMATA), suburban, and intercity services
bicycle, including the Metropolitan Branch Trail, bicycle lanes and Capital Bikeshare stations
on foot: according to WalkScore, NoMa received a score of 93, indicating good walkability

Education
Eighteen schools serve the NoMa neighborhood, from pre-K to university.

References

External links

 NoMa Business Improvement District
 "History of NoMa", NoMa Business Improvement District

2004 establishments in Washington, D.C.
Neighborhoods in Northeast (Washington, D.C.)
Near Northeast (Washington, D.C.)